Ariovistus was a leader of the Suebi and other allied Germanic peoples in the second quarter of the 1st century BC. He and his followers took part in a war in Gaul, assisting the Arverni and Sequani in defeating their rivals, the Aedui. They then settled in large numbers into conquered Gallic territory, in the Alsace region. They were defeated, however, in the Battle of Vosges and driven back over the Rhine in 58 BC by Julius Caesar.

Primary sources
Ariovistus and the events he was part of are known from Caesar's Commentarii de Bello Gallico. Caesar, as a participant in the events, is a primary source, but as his Commentaries were partly political, they may be suspected of being self-serving. Later historians, notably Dio Cassius, are suspicious of his motives.

Role and status
Ariovistus was a native of the Suebi. He spoke Gaulish fluently. He had two wives, one of whom he had brought from home. The second, who was the sister of King Voccio of Noricum, he acquired in an arranged political marriage.

Ariovistus is described by Caesar as rex Germanorum. That is often translated as "king of the Germans", but as Latin had no definite article, it could equally be translated as "king of Germans", with no implication that he ruled all Germans. Indeed, Germania is known to have been divided into many tribal and political groups, many of which were ruled by kings. It is likely that Ariovistus's authority extended only over those Germans who had settled in Gaul.

He was recognised as a king by the Roman Senate, but how closely the Roman title matched Ariovistus's social status among the Germans remains unknown. Similarly, what the senate meant by rex at that moment in the history of the Roman Republic is not clear. The word "king" can have many meanings and did so throughout Rome's centuries of history. Tacitus says that the Germans made a distinction between kings, who were chosen by birth, and military leaders, who were chosen by ability, and that kings did not have absolute power.

Intervention in Gaul
Some time before Caesar's governorship of Gaul (which began in 58 BC), the Gaulish Arverni and Sequani enlisted Ariovistus's aid in their war against the Aedui. The latter were a numerous Celtic people occupying the area of the upper Loire river in France. Their territory lay between their neighbors to the northeast, the Sequani, who occupied the Doubs river valley, and the Arverni in the Massif Central.

Caesar does not say what the cause of the conflict was, but the Sequani controlled access to the Rhine river along the valley of the Doubs. To that end, they had gradually built up an oppidum, or fortified town, at Vesontio. Tradesmen headed up the Rhone and its tributary the Saône (the ancient Arar) could not pass the Doubs at Vesontio without coming to terms with the Sequani, and no one could pass from the Rhine to the Rhone but on similar terms. The east of the entire great channel is bordered by the Jura mountains and the west by the Massif Central.

The Arar formed part of the border between the Aedui and the Sequani. Strabo, who lived a generation after Caesar in the late republic and early empire, does make a statement concerning the cause of the conflict between the Sequani and Aedui, and it was in fact commercial, at least in Strabo's view. Each tribe claimed the Arar and the transportation tolls from traffic along it, "but now", says Strabo, "everything is to the Romans." The Sequani also habitually supported the Germans in their previous frequent expeditions across the river, which shows that Ariovistus's subsequent devastation of Sequani lands represented a new policy.

The location of the final battle between the Aedui and their enemies, which Caesar names as the Battle of Magetobriga, remains unknown, but Ariovistus's 15,000 men turned the tide, and the Aedui became tributary to the Sequani. Cicero writes in 60 BC of a defeat sustained by the Aedui, perhaps in reference to this battle. Ariovistus seized a third of the Aeduan territory, settling 120,000 Germans there. To avoid infringing on his allies for the moment, Ariovistus must have passed over the low divide between the Rhine and the Doubs in the vicinity of Belfort and then have approached the Aedui along the Ognon river valley. That move left the Sequani between him and the Jura mountains, not a tolerable situation for either if they were not going to be allies.

Ariovistus made the decision to clear out the Sequani from the strategic Doubs valley and to repopulate it with Germanic settlers. He demanded a further third of Celtic land for his allies the Harudes. Caesar makes it clear that Germanic tribes were actually in the land of the Sequani and terrorising them. They are said to have controlled all the oppida, but that is not entirely true, as Vesontio was not under Germanic control. However, the country to the north of there was presumably under Germanic control.

Confrontation with Caesar

In 59 BC, while Julius Caesar was consul, Ariovistus had been recognised as "king and friend" by the Roman Senate. He had likely already crossed the Rhine at this point. Cicero indicates that the Aedui's defeat took place in or before 60 BC. Pliny the Elder mentions a meeting between Caesar's predecessor as proconsul of Cisalpine Gaul, Quintus Caecilius Metellus Celer, and a king of the Suebi; which took place during Celer's proconsulship in 62 BC. The sequence of events given by Caesar also seems to indicate that, when his governorship began in 58 BC, the Germans had been settled in Gaul for longer than one year. However, without the status of friend, Ariovistus never could have secured Roman tolerance of his Rhine crossing, whenever it was, but would have been treated as hostile.

However, the Aedui were also allies of Rome, and in 58 BC Diviciacus, one of their senior magistrates, complained of Ariovistus's cruelty and pleaded with Caesar to intervene on their behalf. Caesar sent ambassadors to summon Ariovistus to a conference. Ariovistus refused the summons on the grounds that if Caesar wanted to speak to him, he should come to him; besides, he was not prepared to enter Caesar's territory without his army, which it would be impractical and expensive to gather.

Caesar, therefore, sent his ambassadors back to Ariovistus with his demands: that he bring no more of his people across the Rhine, and that he and his allies restore the hostages they had taken from the Aedui and undertake not to make war against them. He pointed out that Ariovistus was a friend to Rome and that the Romans had a prior interest, which they certainly would enforce. Ariovistus was welcome to keep the friendship of Rome if he would comply. Otherwise he, Caesar, acting in accordance with the decrees of the senate, could not let the harassment of the Aedui go unpunished.

Ariovistus refused to comply, asserting the right of conquest and the right of the conqueror to exact tribute from the conquered. Ridiculing Rome's ability to protect its friends and boasting of Germanic invincibility, Ariovistus invited Caesar to attack him if he wished.

Caesar presents himself as attempting to act as an honest broker in the conflict, offering reasonable terms to settle the matter; however, as Caesar himself relates, Ariovistus later accused him of intending to lead an army against him right from the outset. Cassius Dio, writing more than two centuries later, agrees, characterising Caesar as attempting to provoke a war to win glory and power while he took pains not to look like the aggressor.

Whatever the motivation, Ariovistus overestimated the strength of his position. He apparently believed his official relationship to Rome was one of equals, but the Romans accepted no equals and saw the relationship as one between patron and client. He also appears to have believed the Romans would not attack him.

At the same time that Caesar received Ariovistus's message, he heard from his Celtic allies that the Harudes were devastating the country of the Aedui and that 100 units of Suebi under the brothers Nasua and Cimberius were about to cross the Rhine. In response to such provocative acts, Caesar mobilized his troops.

Battle
Caesar was not far away, probably at or near Bibracte, where he had just won a major victory over the Helvetii and other Celtic tribes, and had disposed of the remaining Boii, allowing them to settle in Aeduan land. As only small numbers of Boii were left after the battle, the Aedui were obliging. Caesar must have immediately begun marching up the Saône valley.

Ariovistus, being a skilled general in his own right, identified Vesontio as the key to the strategic Doubs valley and marched for it, but Caesar, probably relying on intelligence from the Gauls, arrived there first and established a main base. He had to combat a panic among his own men, who had heard that the Germans were some sort of superior warriors. Caesar called a meeting and then berated the centurions for making that necessary instead of just following orders. In one of his noted speeches he recalled them to duty and ended by threatening to march the next morning early with only the 10th legion, about whose valour he said he had no doubts at all. The speech had the intended effect of arousing fanatical loyalty in the 10th and shame and rivalry in the others.

Apparently Ariovistus had learned of the Roman presence there because he stopped marching and waited. Using Diviciacus as a guide, Caesar's troops marched  in 7 days, arriving probably in the vicinity of Belfort. The army was moving only 7 miles per day and was relying on Diviciacus to lead them through open country; thus, it is probably safe to assume there were no Roman roads between Besançon and Belfort at that time. Caesar says that he took a detour to stay in open country, most likely west of the Doubs, through the lands of his Celtic allies.

Ariovistus sent ambassadors to Caesar agreeing, because Caesar had come to him, to a conference. Caesar, known for giving his potential enemies every last chance, entertained the idea that Ariovistus was coming to his senses. It was agreed that they should meet on horseback, accompanied only by cavalry. Caesar brought mounted soldiers of the 10th legion, who joked that they had been promoted to knights, which was the origin of the 10th legion's nickname Equestris.

The meeting of the two on a high mound between the camps with the bodyguards a few hundred yards away is surely a rare event in the history of parlays. They both got a chance to present and defend their points of view, face to face, with no filtering or interference from others. Caesar concentrated on Roman policy. Ariovistus now took the tack of claiming the Aedui had attacked him rather than vice versa.

Caesar reports that Ariovistus stated that "he was not so uncivilized nor so ignorant of affairs, as not to know that the Aedui in the very last war with the Allobroges had neither rendered assistance to the Romans, nor received any from the Roman people in the struggles which the Aedui had been maintaining with him and with the Sequani."

The word rendered above as "uncivilized" (McDevitte & Bohn's translation) is barbarus. The classical civilizations throughout their long literary periods consistently characterized the peoples of the north and east as barbari, usually rendered in English as "barbarians". The word reflected the mixture of condescension, contempt and fear the Greeks and Romans had for those who did not share their civilisation or values. Only rarely did such barbarians manage to make known their feelings about such use of the concept, as did Ariovistus on that occasion.

Ariovistus described official Roman friendship as a sham, and he uttered another uncanny prophecy: that he could gain the real friendship of many leading men at Rome by killing Caesar. Moreover, the senate, he said, had determined that Gaul should be governed by its own laws and so ought to be free. By then, Caesar had to escape to his bodyguards, as the Germanic cavalry was beginning to hurl missiles.

The next day, Ariovistus invited Caesar to another parlay. Making a point to emphasize that he could not trust the Germans, Caesar sent two junior officers, Gaius Valerius Procillus and Marcus Mettius. They found Ariovistus in the process of moving his army up and were put in chains.

Over the next few days, Ariovistus moved his camp to within two miles of Caesar's, covering the move with cavalry skirmishes. The Germanic tribes had developed a special force consisting of cavalry mixed with equal numbers of light infantry whose only function was to support cavalrymen, individually or in units, who had become enmeshed in combat. Caesar's men stood in battle formation outside the walls of his camp each day, but only skirmishes were offered. Finally, from a distance of two miles, Ariovistus cut Caesar's supply line, isolating his garrison.

Caesar claims the Germanic side did not attack in force because their wise women had pronounced from their divinations that they should not engage in battle before the new moon. However, it is evident that there was a more mundane reason for Ariovistus declining battle: he had Caesar surrounded. Dio Cassius notes the presence of Germans on the slope of the hill behind the camp, where the Porta Quaestoria, the gate where provisions were brought in, would have been. Ariovistus had Caesar under siege and hoped to starve him out.

Under its best general, the Roman army now demonstrated the classic tactics that had made Rome master of the entire Mediterranean region to such an extent that the Romans were able to call it "our sea". It is unlikely that Ariovistus suspected what was coming. Caesar knew that the Germans outnumbered him and that his best and only defense was an attack. He had to force the Germans to battle or be starved into surrender.

Leaving a light defense in camp Caesar advanced in acies triplex to within  of the German camp. Under guard of the first two lines, the third built another castra (camp) in which Caesar placed two legions and the auxiliaries while the other four legions returned to the main camp. It is easy to say in retrospect that Ariovistus should have thrown his entire force against the two lines of battle while the third (the reserve) was preoccupied or that he should have attacked the four legions while they were divided from the two, but the tides of battle are never predictable, no matter what the odds.

The next day Caesar used the auxiliaries from the forward camp as cover while he brought all six rested and fed legions to a starting line before it in acies triplex formation. Each tribune conspicuously took personal charge of one legion, and the quaestor took the 6th. Caesar wanted the men to see that they were under the eyes of the entire senior command, which would certainly share their fate. They then began an advance on the weakest feature of the Germanic force, its open camp.

Caesar says that the enemy camp was defended by a wagon train, drawn up behind the German forces, which had now either to fight or to run. The usual chorus of wailing women was placed on the wagons. The effect that it really had on the Germanic soldiers is unclear. The idea was to place the tribe in a situation where they must be victorious or be annihilated with their women and children.

The Germans formed by ethnic group before the Romans: Harudes, Marcomanni, Triboci, Vangiones, Nemetes, Sedusii and Suebi. Apparently, they lacked a reserve, and the Romans followed their established practice of two units forward to one back. Caesar opened the battle with a charge against the Germanic left, which seemed the weakest part of the line. The Germanic forces responded by charging with such speed that the Romans were unable to cast pila and the fight entered the swordplay stage immediately. The Roman open line of battle, in which each man was left room to fight, prevailed. The Germans crowded into a phalanx and began to push the Romans backward, even though the latter jumped up on the shields of the enemy to thrust them downward.

A cavalry officer, Publius Licinius Crassus, from his advantageous position on his horse, grasped what was happening and on his own initiative ordered the third line of battle (the infantry reserve) into action in support of the Roman left. The Romans were momentarily victorious on their left. That decision was usually reserved to senior officers but Crassus won high praise for it after the battle and was probably slated for rapid advancement.

Some, including Ariovistus himself, managed to cross the river in boats or by swimming. The rest were cut down by Roman cavalry, including both of Ariovistus's wives and one of his daughters; another daughter was taken prisoner. Both Caesar's emissaries were rescued unharmed, to relate their harrowing adventures as the Germans debated (in their presence) whether they should be burned then or later. Caesar said that encountering Procillus and freeing him from his chains gave him as much pleasure as the victory, which offers some insight into the emotional climate of Caesar's forces. The officers were a sort of family.

Aftermath
If Caesar named the units in the Germanic army from left to right, the Suebi were on Caesar's right, suffered the brunt of the losses, and they were most pursued by Roman cavalry. The Suebi, who had planned to cross the Rhine, turned back. The Germanic tribes that had joined the Suebi in their foray now bought peace by turning against them and attacking them in retreat. In just a few days, the capability had been removed from the Suebi of mounting any offensive over or on the Rhine, which they assiduously avoided for some time to come, taking refuge in the Black Forest as the future Alamanni.

Ariovistus may have escaped, but it is unlikely that he retained any position in the citizen-army of the Suebi. When the Usipetes and Tencteri were driven from their lands by the Suebi in 55 BC, he was not mentioned. He was dead by late 54 BC, when his death is said to have been a cause of indignation among the Germans.

Caesar was left a free hand on the left bank of the Rhine. He immediately went on to a campaign against the Belgae, and the disposition of the lands on the Rhine is missing from his account. The question of who held Alsace is historically significant. The place names in it are Celtic, but where were the Celts? They do not appear in Caesar's campaign against Ariovistus. Very likely, they had been in part the Boii, who were a strong force on the Danube until they encountered the Marcomanni and Quadi. Fear of the Germani forced them out of the region, only to be mainly destroyed by their opposition to Caesar. Caesar had just settled the last of them among the Aedui when the campaign against Ariovistus began.

In the early Empire, the same Germanic tribes that had fought for Ariovistus appeared on both sides of the Rhine in Alsace. Then, they were of mixed ethnicity and perhaps no longer spoke Germanic. It seems clear that the Romans had allowed them to take the former lands of the now missing Boii, in exchange for serving as a buffer against the Suebi. They did serve long and faithfully. The province of Germania Superior was formed from them. As for the Germans who had already settled among the Celts, it is not clear what happened to them; however, there is no record of any ethnic cleansing. It is more likely that they integrated into the new Romano-Celtic population.

Etymology
Most scholars consider Ariovistus to be derived from the Gaulish ario ("noble, free, advanced") and uid-, uidi-, uissu- ("perception, knowledge").  Ariovistus thus would mean "Noble Sage" or "He Who Knows in Advance." Ariovistus can be found listed in Celtic etymological dictionaries among similar Gaulish names, such as Ariomanus ("Good Leader"), Ariogaisus ("Spear Leader"), and Ariobindus ("White Leader").

Another possibility is that it's a combination of Proto-Germanic *harjaz ("army, host") and *fristaz ("lord, ruler"). In other words, he would've been known by his kinsmen as *Harjafristaz. Similar reconstructed Germanic names are *Harjawaldaz (En. Harold) and *Waldaharjaz (En. Walther), both also translating to army-ruler.

The segmentation of the name into Ario- and -vistus is well established. A 19th-century connection between Ehre, "honor", and Ario- turned out to be invalid. There is currently no complete agreement on how the word should be derived. Most etymological dictionaries are silent about it.

William Smith's Dictionary of Greek and Roman Biography and, under Ariovistus, suggests another derivation of the first element that seems to fit runic inscriptions known today. He translates Ario- by German Heer, "a host" and -vistus by German Fürst, "a prince".

If Ario- is a Roman representation of a Germanic ancestor of Heer, the ancestor is West Germanic *harja- from Germanic *harjaz appearing in such constructs as *harja-waldaz and *harja-bergaz. The Indo-European root is *koro-. The Indo-European linguist, Julius Pokorny, in Indogermanisches Etymologisches Woerterbuch (which is available on the Internet) simply states on Page 67 under ario-? that the Celto-Germanic personal name, Ariovistus, proves nothing (with regard to "Aryan") because it can come from *Hario-.

The reconstructed *harja is actually attested in Runic inscriptions as Harja and Harijaz standing alone (possibly meaning a man of the Harii) Harijaz Leugaz (Lugii?) and Swaba-harjaz (Suebi?) in combination, as well as being a prefix in Hari-uha "first warrior" and Hariwolafz "battle wolf".

Following Smith, Ariovistus translates more directly to "general", raising the possibility that the name is a title granted to the man by the Suebi, his real name subsequently eclipsed by it. Caesar relates that the Suebi maintained a citizen army of 100,000 men picked yearly, and Tacitus that the Suebi were not one tribe. Ariovistus was probably picked from among the generals to lead an army group into Gaul, as seers were generally used for that purpose.

Notes

External links
Indoeuropean Etymological Dictionary

Germanic rulers
Germanic warriors
Suebian people
Barbarian people of the Gallic Wars
54 BC deaths
Year of birth unknown
Place of birth unknown